The 1998–99 Combined Counties Football League season was the 21st in the history of the Combined Counties Football League, a football competition in England.

League table

The league featured 20 clubs from the previous season, along with one new club:
AFC Wallingford, joined from the Chiltonian League

Also, Netherne changed their name to Netherne Village.

External links
 Combined Counties League Official Site

1998-99
1998–99 in English football leagues